The Rumor I Cabinet was the 23rd cabinet of the Italian Republic. 

The government fell in July 1969 following the splitting of the Unitary Socialist Party from the PSI.

Party breakdown
 Christian Democracy (DC): prime minister, 16 ministers, 32 undersecretaries
 Italian Socialist Party (PSI): deputy prime minister, 8 ministers, 22 undersecretaries
 Italian Republican Party (PRI): 1 minister, 2 undersecretaries

Composition

|}

References

Italian governments
1968 establishments in Italy
1969 disestablishments in Italy
Cabinets established in 1968
Cabinets disestablished in 1969